Cú Choigríche Ó Duibhgeannáin (fl. 1627–1636), also styled Peregrine Ó Duibhgeannáin or Peregrine O'Duignan, was an Irish historian and chronicler.

Born Cú Coigriche mac Tuathal Ó Duibhgeannáin, about or after 1590, his name was Latinized to Pereginus (anglicized Peregrine) when he took holy orders in the Franciscan Order based at Leuven, now in Belgium. Cú Coigriche (also Cuchogry) means "hound [or hero] of the neighbouring [or foreign] land." His family, the Clan Uí Dhuibhgeannáin, were professional historians from Annaly, many of whom had crossed the Shannon and practised their art in Connacht. Here the Ó Duibhgeannains set up a bardic college at Kilronan, near Lough Key in northern County Roscommon.

Nothing is known of his life and activities until he began working with Cú Choigcríche Ó Cléirigh and Fearfeasa Ó Maoilchonaire under the direction of Brother Mícheál Ó Cléirigh about 1627. In that year Ó Cléirigh was sent from his mother house at Leuven to Ireland to collect Irish literary, historical and chronological material in danger of being lost. These materials were assembled into a number of compilations, the most famous being the Annals of the Four Masters. 

Nothing is known of Peregrine Ó Duibhgeannáin's life after 1636, the year the annals was completed. It is entirely likely that he returned to Leuven with Brother Mícheál. A slight possibility exists that he remained in Ireland, as a copy of the annals was being used in the town of Galway by Dubhaltach MacFhirbhisigh in the late 1640s. It may not be coincidental that a kinsman of Ó Duibhgeannáin, Daibhidh Ó Duibhgheannáin was living and working in Connemara at least as early as 1651.

See also
 Tadhg Og Ó Cianáin
 Lughaidh Ó Cléirigh
 Mícheál Ó Cléirigh
 James Ussher
 Sir James Ware
 Mary Bonaventure Browne
 Dubhaltach Mac Fhirbhisigh
 Ruaidhrí Ó Flaithbheartaigh
 Uilliam Ó Duinnín
 Charles O'Conor (historian)
 Eugene O'Curry
 John O'Donovan (scholar)
 Ó Duibhgeannáin

Sources
"The Learned Family of O Duigenan", Fr. Paul Walsh, Irish Ecclesiastical Record, 1921
"The Four Masters" (I & II, 1932 & 1934), Fr. Paul Walsh, Irish Leaders & Learning Through the Ages, Four Courts Press, Dublin, 2004, 
 O Duibhgeannain, Cu Choigcriche (O'Duigenan, Peregrine), pp. 435–36, Dictionary of Irish Biography from the Earliest Times to the Year 2002, Cambridge, 2010.

Irish scribes
17th-century Irish historians
Irish chroniclers
People from County Leitrim
Irish-language writers